Ernest Fredric Morrison (December 20, 1912 – July 24, 1989) was an American child actor, comedian,  vaudevillian and dancer who also performed under the stage name Sunshine Sammy Morrison and was the only black member of the East Side Kids, and also was an original performer in the Our Gang short film series franchise (the 1920s silent film series).

Early life
Born in 1912 in New Orleans, Morrison was the brother of Florence Morrison and stage and screen actress Dorothy Morrison, he fell into show business because a child actor being used for a film could not be persuaded to do anything but howl. One of the crew members asked Morrison's father Ernest Morrison Sr. to bring in his newborn son, and since the newest member of the Morrison clan gave the film crew what they needed, they decided to christen him "Sunshine," since he did not cry. Morrison's father added "Sammy" to his son's moniker to create his stage name of Sunshine Sammy.

Biography
Morrison ultimately appeared in two-reel silent comedies opposite both Harold Lloyd and Snub Pollard, two of the era's biggest comedians. He was the first African American actor to be signed to a long-term contract, signing with studio executive and comedy producer Hal Roach in 1919. When Roach conceived his Our Gang series, featuring child actors in a natural juvenile setting in 1921, Sammy was the first child recruited. Morrison left the series in January 1925, after Roach refused his father's demand of a $75 a week pay rise (taking his weekly wage to $300), and went to work in vaudeville, where his talents were featured on the same bills with such up-and-coming acts as Abbott and Costello and Jack Benny. He appeared in Paul Parrott shorts in 1926.

After touring in Australia with partner Sleepy Williams, Morrison returned to the United States and was chosen by Sam Katzman to be one of the East Side Kids. From the beginning, Morrison tapped into his experiences growing up on the East Side of New York City to shape the character of "Scruno." He spent three years with the gang before leaving to pursue other opportunities, often doing promotional stints with Huntz Hall and Bobby Jordan. Morrison left the Kids when he was offered an opportunity to work with the Step Brothers act, a prominent black stage and film dance act. He was drafted into the army during World War II. After being discharged, he was offered a part in The Bowery Boys series that was just being launched, but he declined the offer.  Morrison made mention of this in interviews, saying he "didn't like the setup."

Morrison later worked as a quality control inspector for an aerospace company in Compton, California. In later years, Morrison appeared in a guest spot on the sitcom Good Times airing in 1974.

Morrison died of cancer in Lynwood aged 76, on July 24, 1989. He is interred at Inglewood Park Cemetery in Inglewood, California, where later Our Gang cast member Buckwheat Thomas is also buried.

Selected filmography

References

Bibliography
 Holmstrom, John. The Moving Picture Boy: An International Encyclopaedia from 1895 to 1995, Norwich, Michael Russell, 1996, pp. 56–58.
 Dye, David. Child and Youth Actors: Filmography of Their Entire Careers, 1914-1985. Jefferson, NC: McFarland & Co., 1988, p. 165.

External links

 Retrieved on 2009-05-18
 Retrieved on 2009-05-18

1912 births
1989 deaths
African-American male actors
American male child actors
American male film actors
United States Army personnel of World War II
American male silent film actors
American male television actors
Burials at Inglewood Park Cemetery
Deaths from cancer in California
Hal Roach Studios actors
Male actors from New Orleans
Vaudeville performers
20th-century American male actors
African-American male child actors
American male comedy actors
Our Gang
20th-century African-American people
Comedians from Louisiana
Comedians from Los Angeles County